KONČAR – Elektroindustrija d.d. is a Croatian electrical, transport and energy company based in Trešnjevka neighborhood of Zagreb, Croatia.

Listed on the Zagreb Stock Exchange being constituent of CROBEX, the company consists of 16 subsidiary companies (as of 2017), employing a staff of 3,600. Annual sales account for 460 million euros, of which half are exports. During recent years, KONČAR has delivered its products and plants to more than 100 countries across all continents.

KONČAR dates from 1921, when a modest but at the time highly significant manufacture of electrical motors commenced in Zagreb. The company is named after World War II resistance fighter Rade Končar.

KONČAR – Catering Equipment

KONČAR — Catering Equipment Ltd. is an industrial company that operates within the KONČAR Group. The company was founded in 1946 and specializes in the design, manufacture, installation and servicing of professional catering equipment.

KONČAR — Catering Equipment Ltd company offers a wide range of professional catering products based on turnkey system.

Products include: cooking equipment, neutral equipment, refrigeration equipment of various sizes and purposes, professional dishwashers, special equipment for hospital kitchens, marine equipment, special equipment, Free-Flow System, etc.

The production lines are located in an industrial facility organized under the ISO 9001:2008 quality management system. All products are manufactured in accordance with relevant guidelines and standards of Republic of Croatia and European Union.

Since 1994, Končar has been working with Siemens as part of the Končar Power Transformers (KPT) joint venture, manufacturing power transformers at the Zagreb plant.

Railway Products

Locomotives
 HŽ series 1142

DMU and EMU
 HŽ series 6112
 HŽ series 7022

Tram and light rail
 TMK 2100
 TMK 2200
 TMK 2200 K

Gallery

See also
 Industry of Croatia
 Nuclear energy in Croatia

References

External links 
 

Manufacturing companies of Croatia
Rail vehicle manufacturers of Croatia
Manufacturing companies established in 1921
Transport companies established in 1921
1921 establishments in Croatia
Companies listed on the Zagreb Stock Exchange
Croatian brands
Companies based in Zagreb